Al-Yarmouk is one of the areas of the Greater Amman Municipality, Jordan.

References 

 

Districts of Amman